Lonicera alpigena L., known as alpine honeysuckle, is a species of honeysuckle native to mountain forests of Central and Southern Europe. It is sometimes cultivated as an ornamental plant outside its native range. It is a deciduous shrub up to 2 m high, and in late summer, bears conspicuous brilliant red inedible fruits superficially resembling cherries. L. glehnii F. Schmidt, which is native to Sakhalin, Kurile Islands, Hokkaido and Honshu, is sometimes considered as a geographically disjunct subspecies of alpine honeysuckle, L. alpigena L. subsp. glehnii (F. Schmidt) H. Hara.

References

External links
 
 

alpigena
Plants described in 1753
Taxa named by Carl Linnaeus
Flora of Europe